Structural maintenance of chromosomes protein 2 (SMC-2), also known as chromosome-associated protein E (CAP-E), is a protein that in humans is encoded by the SMC2 gene.

SMC-2 is a core subunit of condensin I and II, large protein complexes involved in chromosome condensation.

Interactions 

SMC2 has been shown to interact with DNMT3B.

References

Further reading

External links 
 PDBe-KB provides an overview of all the structure information available in the PDB for Human Structural maintenance of chromosomes protein 2
 PDBe-KB provides an overview of all the structure information available in the PDB for Mouse Structural maintenance of chromosomes protein 2